Reza Kabul is an architect, interior designer and Urban planner.

Early life and education
Kabul grew up living above his father's Irani café in Mumbai. He and his brothers worked there after school and even managed it when their father was away. He attained his Bachelor of Architecture (BArch) from the Maharaja Sayajirao University of Baroda in 1985.

Career
Reza Kabul established Reza Kabul Architects Pvt. Ltd. in 1988. In 2011, the studio marked its milestone of 25 years in the industry with the launch of Archlights, a The Times of India (Times Property) initiative that profiled and highlighted his contribution to architecture and real estate development. The four-paged edition featured Kabul's projects, alongside testimonials from the construction industry members. The firm has now grown into an international practice with offices in Mumbai, Pune and San Francisco.

Projects
Formerly known as 96 Iconic Tower, Altitude (Colombo, Sri Lanka), is an upcoming 96 storey mixed-use development dedicated to the Sri Lankan Cricketers that won the 1996 World Cup and consists of four cricket bat shaped structures with a cricket ball balanced between the handles. The tower will have 18 escalators connecting a four-level shopping area, along with four lifts for residents and two for staff. It also hosts an observatory on the 92nd level and the Sri Lankan Cricket Legends Museum on the 93rd floor.
Transcon Triumph designed by Reza Kabul  won the Best Residential High-rise Development - India at the Asia Pacific 2015 Awards by International Property Awards. The project was also Highly Commended in the under the Apartment - India, Residential Development - India, and Residential High-rise Architecture - India categories.
Shreepati Arcade

Awards
 2004 : Accommodation Times for The Best Architect of the Year
 2006 : Gun Gaurav Puraskar by The Practicing Engineers Architects and Town Planners Association (PEATA India) for Outstanding Contribution & Research in Architecture
 2012 : DNA - The Next Generation 
 2015 : The Johnson - Society Honours Award for Creative Excellence

References

Indian interior designers
Living people
20th-century Indian designers
Year of birth missing (living people)